Wiseman Mukhobe (born 13 October 1997) is a Kenyan athlete. He was a medalist at the 2022 Commonwealth Games as part of the Kenya team in the 4x400m relay, and finished fourth in the final of the 400m hurdles.

Career
Mukhobe finished fourth in the men’s 400m hurdles at the 2022 Commonwealth Games. Mukhobe then won a bronze medal as part of the Kenyan 4 x 400m relay team which came third at the same Games.

References

1997 births
Living people
Athletes (track and field) at the 2022 Commonwealth Games
Commonwealth Games medallists in athletics
Kenyan male sprinters
21st-century Kenyan people
Commonwealth Games bronze medallists for Kenya
Medallists at the 2022 Commonwealth Games